South Arapaho Peak is in the Indian Peaks Wilderness in the northern Front Range of the Rocky Mountains of North America.  The  thirteener is located west-southwest of the Town of Ward, Colorado, United States, just east of the Continental Divide separating Roosevelt National Forest and Boulder County from Arapaho National Forest and Grand County.

Between South Arapaho Peak and neighboring North Arapaho Peak sits Arapaho Glacier, which is owned by the City of Boulder as part of its water supply.  North and South Arapahoe Peaks are connected by a 0.8 mile, Class 4 connecting ridge. West of these peaks is Arapaho Pass.

See also
 North Arapaho Peak
 Arapaho Pass (Front Range)

References

Mountains of Colorado
North American 4000 m summits
Great Divide of North America
Roosevelt National Forest
Arapaho National Forest
Mountains of Grand County, Colorado
Mountains of Boulder County, Colorado